Ultima Online: The Second Age was the first expansion for the Ultima Online MMORPG. The expansion added several features to the game, including a new region called the Lost Lands, new creatures, and support for player-built cities. 

The Second Age was developed by Origin Systems and published by Electronic Arts in 1998.  It was the last Ultima Online expansion designed by Raph Koster.

Added content
The Second Age expansion introduced many new gameplay features, creatures, monsters, and areas to Ultima Online.

Lost Lands
The Lost Lands are a continental landmass added to the playable area of the game that featured two cities, Papua and Delucia, and one dungeon, Terathan Keep. In Ultima lore, these lands were discovered or activated as the result of geological activity caused by the casting of the "Armageddon" spell by the Followers of Armageddon (or Zog Cabal).  There are 11 entrances the Lost Lands, all of which can be accessed by either boat, foot/mount, or teleportation.

Papua
Papua, nicknamed "Swamp City"  is the smaller of the two towns introduced in T2A and is located on the northeastern edge of the central landmass of the Lost Lands. It can be easily accessed by saying "recdu" while standing on a certain pentagram in the city of Moonglow. Conversely, one may stand on the pentagram in Papua and say "recsu" to be teleported back to Moonglow. Papua has a dock for ships, making the town accessible by water as well. The city is composed of grass huts and features several interactive NPC's: an alchemist, baker, blacksmith, butcher, carpenter, healer, jeweler, provisioner, shipwright, stablemaster, tailor and tinker all reside in the town. The styling of the town and the surrounding marshlands mimick the look of real-world Papua New Guinea.

Delucia
Delucia is the larger of the two towns introduced in T2A and is located in the southwestern corner of the Lost Lands and may sometimes be called the "City of Ruins." Cotton fields, minable mountainsides, harvestable lettuce and turnip fields, a bank, a mage shop, a healer, and a provisioner can all be found in the town.

Mobs
The Second Age expansion added various new creatures and monsters (also known as mobs) that are unique to the Lost Lands and are meant to fit the lore surrounding the areas in which they can be found.

Creatures
Bullfrog
Frost Spider
Giant Ice Serpent
Giant Toad
Ice Snake
Lava Lizard
Nightmare
Forest Ostard
Destert Ostard
Frenzied Ostard

Monsters
Cyclopian Warrior
Frost Troll
Ice Elemental
Ice Fiend
Imp
Mummy
Ophidian Apprentice Mage
Ophidian Avenger
Ophidian Enforcer
Ophidian Justicar
Ophidian Knight-Errant
Ophidian Matriarch
Ophidian Shaman
Ophidian Warrior
Ophidian Zealot
Snow Elemental
Stone Gargoyle
Stone Harpy
Swamp Tentacle
Terathan Avenger
Terathan Drone
Terathan Matriarch
Terathan Warrior
Titan
Wyvern

Reception

Next Generation reviewed the PC version of the game, rating it five stars out of five, and stated that "If you're a fantasy role-player, an online chatter, an Ultima, or a previous player who logged out in the Dark Times and never returned, it's time to pack your bags for Britannia. The Second Age is an Avatar's dream come true."

Although critical reaction to the game was mixed, The Second Age was awarded "Online Roleplaying Game of the Year" at the 1999 Interactive Achievement Awards.  Many reviews criticized The Second Age for not expanding the game enough, especially since gamers were anticipating the 3D MMORPGs EverQuest and Asheron's Call.

References

External links
 Official Ultima Online website

Role-playing video games
Interactive Achievement Award winners
Ultima Online
Video game expansion packs
Video games developed in the United States
Windows games
Windows-only games
1998 video games
D.I.C.E. Award for Online Game of the Year winners